Abbeville Christian Academy is a PK–12 private Christian college-preparatory school in Abbeville, Alabama, USA. Abbeville Christian Academy is a fully accredited member of the Alabama Independent School Association, NCPSA, and SACS. Abbeville was founded in 1970 as a segregation academy. In 2016, three black children were enrolled in this school of 234. The surrounding community is 40% Black.

References

External links
 

Christian schools in Alabama
Private K-12 schools in Alabama
Schools in Henry County, Alabama
Educational institutions established in 1970
Segregation academies in Alabama